Alliance Laundry Systems LLC is a provider of commercial laundry systems. The company designs, manufactures, and markets a line of commercial laundry equipment under various brands in over 100 countries.  Among the company’s products are washers, drying tumblers and ironers for the coin laundry, multi-housing laundries, institutional laundries and laundries for consumer residences. Alliance Laundry Systems manufactures products under the brands Speed Queen, Primus, Huebsch, IPSO, and UniMac. The company was founded in 1998 and is based in Ripon, Wisconsin. However, Alliance claims the precursor's founding date as the beginning for the company.

History

Background 
The company's precursor Barlow & Seelig Manufacturing was established in 1908 and later introduced a hand-operated washer to the marketplace. The Speed Queen brand was created in 1928 with the introduction of stainless steel wash tubs in 1939 and automatic washers and dryers in 1952. Eventually Barlow & Seelig was renamed Speed Queen Company, and was later purchased by McGraw-Edison. In 1979, McGraw-Edison sold its appliance division to Raytheon Company.

Formation 
In February 1998, private equity firm Bain Capital agreed to acquire the commercial laundry business from Raytheon for $358 million. And as a result, Alliance Laundry Systems was formed.

In January 2005, Teachers' Private Capital, the private equity affiliate of the Ontario Teachers' Pension Plan acquired the majority of the equity interests of Alliance Laundry for $450 million.

In 2009, the Alliance Laundry Systems University (ALSU) was founded as a corporate university available online to authorized Alliance Laundry Systems distributors, route operators and customers.

In March 2014, the Alliance Laundry acquired Primus Laundry Equipment headquartered in Gullegem, Belgium for approx. $259.4 million.

In April 2015, it was reported that Ontario Teachers' Pension Plan was planning to sell Alliance Laundry or issue an IPO, valuing the business at $1.8 billion. Later in 2015, a majority stake was sold to BDT Capital Partners.

References

Companies based in Wisconsin
Fond du Lac County, Wisconsin
Manufacturing companies based in Wisconsin
Home appliance manufacturers of the United States
1998 establishments in Wisconsin
Ripon, Wisconsin
American companies established in 1998
Manufacturing companies established in 1998